Hoopers Valley Island is an island located by Hoopers Valley, New York, on the Susquehanna River.

A link to the map of this island: https://www.google.com/maps/place/Hoopers+Valley,+NY+13812/@42.0258716,-76.3947104,15z/data=!4m5!3m4!1s0x89daa1bbf1ce9323:0xdb44eda189a7f07c!8m2!3d42.0264632!4d-76.3929937

References

Landforms of Tioga County, New York
Islands of the Susquehanna River in New York (state)
Islands of New York (state)